Football was contested for men only at the 1959 Central American and Caribbean Games in Caracas, Venezuela.

The gold medal was won by Mexico for the third time, who earned 8 points

Participating teams

Table 
A 2 point system used.

Results

Statistics

Goalscorers

References

External links
 

1959 Central American and Caribbean Games
1959